Di'anmen or Bei'anmen was an imperial gate in Beijing, China. The gate was first built in the Yongle period of the Ming dynasty, and served as the main northern gate to the Imperial City (the southern gate is the much more famed Tiananmen). The gate is located north of Jingshan Park and south of the Drum Tower. The gate was demolished in 1954. Efforts to restore it have been under way since 2013.

Chinese architectural history
Gates of Beijing
Neighbourhoods of Beijing
Demolished buildings and structures in China
Buildings and structures demolished in 1954